The List of Albania international footballers includes all the individual players who made between 1 and 24 appearances for Albania in the qualifiers of the UEFA European Football Championship, the FIFA World Cup, friendly matches as well as its participation in the Balkan Cup and in the Malta (Rothmans) International Tournament, from 1946 to the present.

Players

Below is a full-list of the players who have made between 1 and 24 appearances for Albania, as of 11 June 2016 after the match against Israel''.

References

 
Association football player non-biographical articles